Amarbayasgalan Dashzegve (also referred to as Dashzegviin Amarbayasgalan; born on November 27th, 1981) is the current Secretary General of the ruling Mongolian People's Party, beginning his term as Acting Secretary General on July 28, 2016 after the landslide victory in the 2016 Mongolian legislative elections. He was elected to an unprecedented fourth term as Secretary General of the Mongolian People’s Party in 2021 and is regarded to be next generation of leadership of the country. He is a social democratic, center left and progressive Mongolian politician.

Political career

Early days (2007–2016) 
Amarbayasgalan joined the Mongolian People's Party in 1998 and became a leader of the 37th Party cell in Bayanzurkh district in 2007. Following his success leading the 2008 Mongolian legislative election campaign activities, Amarbayasgalan became the youngest Citizens’ Representative to be elected in 2008, at 26 years old.

As a young leader with innovative political approaches, Amarbayasgalan was appointed as the Head of the Communications and public relations division of the Party by the then Secretary General of the MPP Khurelsukh Ukhnaa.

In 2012, Amarbayasgalan was re-elected to the Ulaanbaatar city Citizens’ Representative Council. At that time, the MPP was in opposition, having lost the local and national elections.

Secretary General (2016 – Present) 
The 7th MPP Conference appointed Amarbayasgalan as Secretary General on December 12, 2016. At the 28th Party Congress held on November 23, 2017, Khurelsukh Ukhnaa was elected Chairman of the Party while Amarbayasgalan was re-elected.

At the 30th Party Congress in 2021, Luvsannamsrain Oyun-Erdene was elected Chairman of the Party, and the First Party Conference supported Amarbayasgalan’s fourth term as Secretary General on December 8, 2021.

Personal life 
Amarbayasgalan lives with his wife and four children.

References

External links 
 

21st-century Mongolian politicians
Living people
1981 births